Miroljub Jevtić (born 1955 in Vranje, SFR Yugoslavia) is Serbian Politologist of religion and professor at the Faculty of Political Science, University of Belgrade.

Career

Jevtić graduated from the Faculty of Political Science at the University of Belgrade, Serbia.
He received a master's degree from the University of Belgrade's Law School; his thesis was entitled ”Islamic understanding of war and the role of the Islamic Conference in preserving the peace”.
Jevtić studied for his doctorate at the Faculty of Political Science, University of Belgrade, Serbia. His thesis was titled ”Modern Jihad and war”. Jevtić began his academic career in the 1983 as a teacher of People defence and protection (Narodna odbrana i zaštita), a course that was abolished with the breakup of socialism in Southeast Europe in the beginning of the 1990s.
Founder and editor-in-chief of the “Polititcs and Religion” journal, the first global scientific journal dedicated to the discipline ”Political Science of Religion“ or “Politicology of Religion”. The first issue was  published in 2007, in Belgrade, Serbia. Published by the ”Center for Study of  Religion and  Religious  Tolerance”.

Career at the Faculty of Political Science, University of Belgrade, Serbia:
Assistant-intern – 1983
Assistant – 1985
Docent – 1988
Part-time Professor – 1993
Professor – 1998 (Religion and Politics)

Professional publications
Professor Jevtić was the author of the monograph dedicated to the Jihad in the Balkans. It was the first such publication ever published in the area covered by his research.

Professor Jevtić was one of the earliest academics in the field to introduce 1993/94  "Politology of Religion" or “Politicology of Religion“ in the curriculum of the Faculty of Political Science http://www.fpn.bg.ac.rs/en/undergraduate-studies/political-department/third-year/ . Professor Jevtić coined the term White Al-Qaeda.

Criticism 
Jevtić's views on Islam as an aggressive religion are subject to much controversy and are disputed by western and Muslim scholars of the region. Along with Darko Tanasković, he has been criticized as a "propagandist" in the context of anti-Bosniak and anti-Albanian attitude in the context of the Yugoslav wars, and that they picture Islam as backward and violent as a rule. However, when looking at his work as a whole, he does not describe Islam as an aggressive religion but as a religion that is realized through a legal system that is inseparable from religion. Jevtić in 1990 claimed that Sandžak Muslims are “neither Muslims, nor Bosniaks, nor Kemal Ataturk’s Turks. They are Ottomans".

Retired professor of Islamic studies H.T. Norris contends that scholars like Jevtić were used by the Serbian media throughout the 1980s to justify their anti-Muslim prejudices and to stroke anti-Muslim hatred among Serbs. In a 1989 interview with the Serbian journal Duga, Jevtić claimed that Islam is aggressive and violent by nature and that Arab Muslims are trying to impose a global Islamic state and attempting to rekindle Islam in Yugoslavia as a step to accomplishing that goal. In the same interview, Jevtić also claimed that the Bosniaks are traitors to their race and that embracing Islam was a grave act of disloyalty and betrayal. Norris argues that these anti-Muslim and anti-Bosniak pieces and their use by like-minded scholars ultimately succeeded in sowing hatred among the Serbs towards Muslims which helped justify their resulting violence against them.

Books
Challenges of Politology of Religion,Center for Study of Religion and Religious Tolerance, Belgrade,2014,
Problems of Politology of Religion,Center for Study of Religion and Religious Tolerance, Belgrade,2012,
Political Relations and Religion,Center for Study of Religion and Religious Tolerance, Belgrade,2011,
Religion as Challenge of Political Science,Center for Study of Religion and Religious Tolerance, Belgrade,2010, 
Politology of Religion,Center for Study of Religion and Religious Tolerance, Belgrade,2009, 
Religion and Power, Essays on Politology of Religion,Dioceze of Ras-Prizren and Kosovo-Metohija;Center for Study of Religion and Religious Tolerance, Belgrade,2008,(English Edition)
Religion and Politics – Introduction to Politicology of  Religion; Institute for Political Studies and Faculty of Political Science; Belgrade, Serbia; 2002; .
Modern Jihad as War; First Edition – 1989; Nova Knjiga, Belgrade, Serbia; ; Second Edition – 1995; Grafomotajica, Prnjavor, Bosnia and Herzegovina; ; Third Edition – 2001; Nikola Pašić, Belgrade, Serbia; .
From the Islamic Declaration to the Religious War in Bosnia and Herzegovina; First Edition – 1993; Filip Višnjić, Belgrade, Serbia; ; Second Edition – 1995; Grafomotajica, Prnjavor, Bosnia and Herzegovina; .
Albanians and Islam – 1995; Grafomotajnica, Prnjavor, Bosnia and Herzegovina; .
Islam in the Works of Ivo Andrić – 2000; Private Edition, Prosveta Internacional, Belgrade, Serbia.
All Our Delusions – 1998; Private Edition, Prosveta Internacional, Belgrade, Serbia.
Islam and Geo-Political Logic – 1995; Co-Authored With Others; Koving-Inžinjering, Belgrade, Serbia.
The crime Awaits the Punishment – 1997; Co-Authored With Others; Megilot Publishing, Olet Press/ Imel Publishing, (Novi Sad, Srpsko Sarajevo); .(English Edition)
Muslims between Religion and Nation – 1996; Co-Authored with Others; People and University Library Petar Kocić, Banja Luka, Bosnia and Herzegovina; .

Internet Publications
Religion as a Determining Factor in the West’s Siding With Albanian Secessionism (English)
Religion as a Determining Factor in the West’s Siding With Albanian Secessionism (Serbian)
Jihad in Domestic and International Public (Serbian)

References

External links
Faculty of Political Science, Belgrade, Serbia
Glas Javnosti, Belgrado, Serbia, Interview – December 11, 2006

20th-century Serbian historians
Scholars of Islam
1955 births
Critics of Islam
University of Belgrade Faculty of Law alumni
Living people
People from Vranje
21st-century Serbian historians